FKM is a family of fluorocarbon-based fluoroelastomer materials defined by ASTM International standard D1418, and ISO standard 1629. It is commonly called fluorine rubber or fluoro-rubber. FKM is an abbreviation of Fluorine Kautschuk Material.  All FKMs contain vinylidene fluoride as a monomer. Originally developed by DuPont (under the brand name Viton, now owned by Chemours), FKMs are today also produced by many companies, including: Daikin (Dai-El), 3M (Dyneon), Solvay S.A. (Tecnoflon), HaloPolymer (Elaftor), Gujarat Fluorochemicals (Fluonox), and several Chinese manufacturers. Fluoroelastomers are more expensive than neoprene or nitrile rubber elastomers. They provide additional heat and chemical resistance. FKMs can be divided into different classes on the basis of either their chemical composition, their fluorine content, or their cross-linking mechanism.

Types
On the basis of their chemical composition FKMs can be divided into the following types:
 Type-1 FKMs are composed of vinylidene fluoride (VDF) and hexafluoropropylene (HFP). Copolymers are the standard type of FKMs showing a good overall performance. Their fluorine content is approximately 66 weight percent.
 Type-2 FKMs are composed of VDF, HFP, and tetrafluoroethylene (TFE). Terpolymers have a higher fluorine content compared to copolymers (typically between 68 and 69 weight percent fluorine), which results in better chemical and heat resistance. Compression set and low temperature flexibility may be affected negatively.
 Type-3 FKMs are composed of VDF, TFE, and perfluoromethylvinylether (PMVE). The addition of PMVE provides better low temperature flexibility compared to copolymers and terpolymers. Typically, the fluorine content of type-3 FKMs ranges from 62 to 68 weight percent.
 Type-4 FKMs are composed of propylene, TFE, and VDF. While base resistance is increased in type-4 FKMs, their swelling properties, especially in hydrocarbons, are worsened. Typically, they have a fluorine content of about 67 weight percent.
 Type-5 FKMs are composed of VDF, HFP, TFE, PMVE, and ethylene.  Known for base resistance and high-temperature resistance to hydrogen sulfide.

Cross-linking mechanisms
There are three established cross-linking mechanisms used in the curing process of FKMs.
 Diamine cross-linking using a blocked diamine. In the presence of basic (alkaline) media, VDF is vulnerable to dehydrofluorination, which enables the addition of the diamine to the polymer chain. Typically, magnesium oxide is used to neutralize the resulting hydrofluoric acid and rearrange into magnesium fluoride and water. Although rarely used today, diamine curing provides superior rubber-to-metal bonding properties as compared with other cross-linking mechanisms. The diamine's capability to be hydrated makes the diamine cross-link vulnerable in aqueous media.
 Ionic cross-linking (dihydroxy cross-linking) was the next step in curing FKMs. This is today the most common cross-linking chemistry used for FKMs.  It provides superior heat resistance, improved hydrolytic stability and better compression set than diamine curing. In contrast to diamine curing, the ionic mechanism is not an addition mechanism but an aromatic nucleophilic substitution. Dihydroxy aromatic compounds are used as the cross-linking agent, and quaternary phosphonium salts are typically used to accelerate the curing process.
 Peroxide cross-linking was originally developed for type 3 FKMs containing PMVE as diamine and bisphenolic cross-linking systems can lead to cleavage in a polymer backbone chain containing PMVE.  While diamine and bisphenolic cross-linking are ionic reactions, peroxide cross-linking is a free-radical mechanism. Though peroxide cross-links are not as thermally stable as bisphenolic cross-links, they normally are the system of choice in aqueous media and nonaqueous electrolyte media.

Properties
Fluoroelastomers provide excellent high temperature (up to 500°F or 260°C) and aggressive fluids resistance when compared with other elastomers, while combining the most effective stability to many sorts of chemicals and fluids such as oil, diesel, ethanol mix or body fluid.

The performance of fluoroelastomers in aggressive chemicals depends on the nature of the base polymer and the compounding ingredients used for molding the final products (e.g. o-rings). Some formulations are generally compatible with hydrocarbons, but incompatible with ketones such as acetone and methyl ethyl ketone, ester solvents such as ethyl acetate, amines, and organic acids such as acetic acid.

They can be easily distinguished from many other elastomers because of their high density of over 1800 kg/m3, significantly higher than most types of rubber.

Applications
Because of their outstanding performance they find use in a number of sectors, including the following:

 Chemical process and petroleum refining, where they are used for seals, pumps, gaskets and so on, due to their resistance to chemicals;
 Analysis and process instruments: separators, diaphragms, cylindrical fittings, hoops, gaskets, etc.
 Semiconductor manufacturing;
 Food and pharmaceutical, because of their low degradation, also in contact with fluids;
 Aviation and aerospace: high operating temperatures and high altitudes require superior heat and low-temperature resistance.

They are suitable for the production of wearables, due to low wear and discoloration even during prolonged lifetimes in contact with skin oils and frequent exposure to light, while guaranteeing high comfort and stain resistance;

The automotive industry represents their main application sector, where constant reach for higher efficiencies push manufacturers towards high-performing materials. An example are FKM o-rings used as an upgrade to the original neoprene seals on Corvair pushrod tubes that deteriorated under the high heat produced by the engine, allowing oil leakage. FKM tubing or lined hoses are commonly recommended in automotive and other transportation fuel applications when high concentrations of biodiesel are required. Studies indicate that types B and F (FKM- GBL-S and FKM-GF-S) are more resistant to acidic biodiesel. (This is because biodiesel fuel is unstable and oxidizing.)

FKM O-rings have been used safely for some time in SCUBA diving by divers using gas blends referred to as nitrox. FKMs are used because they have a lower probability of catching fire, even with the increased percentages of oxygen found in nitrox. They are also less susceptible to decay under increased oxygen conditions.

While these materials have a wide range of applications, their cost is prohibitive when compared to other types of elastomers, meaning that their adoption must be justified by the need for outstanding performance (as in the aerospace sector) and is inadvisable for low-cost products.

FKM/butyl gloves are highly impermeable to many strong organic solvents that would destroy or permeate commonly used gloves (such as those made with nitriles).

Precautions 
At high temperatures or in a fire, fluoroelastomers decompose and may release hydrogen fluoride. Any residue must be handled using protective equipment.

See also 
 Magnesium/Teflon/Viton
 FFKM, perfluoro-elastomers
 FEPM, tetrafluoro ethylene/propylene elastomers

References

 
  Overview of different types and their applications.

External links 
 Properties of Elastomers - Chemical Resitancelist (PDF; 0,6 MB)
 Designing with Fluoroelastomers (PDF; 0,8 MB)

Organofluorides
Elastomers
Materials science
Fluoropolymers